Omemee Aerodrome  is a registered aerodrome located  east northeast of Omemee, Ontario in Ontario Canada.

References

Buildings and structures in Kawartha Lakes
Registered aerodromes in Ontario